The Legend of Sword and Fairy, also known colloquially as Sword and Fairy 1, is an adventure role-playing video game developed by the Taiwanese game company Softstar Entertainment. Initially released in 1995 for the MS-DOS platform, the game incorporates elements of wuxia, shenmo and xianxia fantasy, and draws heavy inspirations from traditional Chinese mythology. It has been widely praised as one of the most iconic and influential Chinese RPG games of all time, and has since spawned a successful video game franchise in Taiwan and Mainland China. In addition to video games, it has also developed into a media franchise, most famously a television series adaptation by Tangren Media in 2005 starring Hu Ge in his breakout acting role.

English translations of the game title
The game title was unofficially translated into English as The Magic Sword and the Chivalrous Youngsters, and Chinese Paladin. Softstar Entertainment officially named it The Legend of Sword and Fairy upon the release of the sequel. However, in the third and fourth instalments, the English title was changed to Chinese Paladin and has remained as such since then.

Plot
 Note: There are many subtle differences among the numerous versions of the game. The plot provided in this section is based on the version for Windows 95 and 98.

Li Xiaoyao, the protagonist of the game, is an orphan who lives with his aunt in a small fishing village near Suzhou, China. When his aunt falls sick, Li travels across the sea to a mystical island in search of a cure for his aunt. He meets a maiden Zhao Ling'er, whom he falls in love with. Forced by Zhao's nanny to marry Zhao and remain on the island forever, he manages to escape with the medicine and succeeds in healing his aunt. However, he loses the memory of his encounter on the island after being tricked into consuming a memory-erasing drug. He meets Zhao again, saving her from a group of enemies, who have destroyed her home and murdered her nanny. He then decides to accompany her to southwestern China in search of her mother, who might still be alive.

Li and Zhao arrive in Suzhou and meet Lin Yueru, the spoiled daughter of a wealthy martial artist. Li unexpectedly defeats Lin in a martial arts contest and wins her hand in marriage. When Li shows reluctance to marry Lin, her father threatens to kill him if he does not marry her, so Li pretends to agree, but plans to escape later. On their wedding night, a giant serpent is sighted and Zhao disappears under mysterious circumstances. Li and Lin believe that Zhao has been captured by a monster, so they set off in search of her and arrive in Sichuan, where the Mount Shu School, a powerful martial arts school, is based. They learn that Zhao is actually a half-serpent spirit and has been imprisoned in the Demon Prison Tower by the Mount Shu elders. Li and Lin break into the tower and succeed in rescuing Zhao after making a perilous descent to its lowest level. However, they all suffer grave injuries when the tower collapses while they are escaping from it.

The trio are saved by an herbal medicine guru, who tells Li that Zhao is pregnant with his child, and that Lin has died from her wounds. Li is deeply saddened by Lin's death, but he puts aside his grief because he has a more important mission to complete: find two rare items which can save the lives of Zhao and their unborn baby. Li's quest takes him to southwestern China, where the Miao people live. He meets and befriends Anu, a White Miao princess, who tells him the history of her homeland. The Miao land has been affected by a prolonged drought and the White and Black Miao are at war with each other over scarce resources. Li completes his mission and Zhao recovers, after which she summons a rainstorm and restores peace to the Miao land. Through their adventures, Li, Zhao and Anu discover that the drought was actually caused by an evil Black Miao cleric. They confront him and defeat him in a battle. During the battle, Zhao sacrifices herself to destroy an ancient water monster summoned by the cleric.

Li is traumatised by the loss of Zhao and Lin. He bids Anu farewell and walks away alone. Just then, he sees Lin, carrying his child. Lin's reappearance at the end of the game is often disputed, but the official story released by Softstar Entertainment claims that Lin is dead and cannot be resurrected. However, her body may be brought back to life, but she will never be the same as before because her soul is dead.

Gameplay
The player guides the characters through China in landscapes consisting of cities, mazes, dungeons, cave tunnels and wilderness. The game has no overland map; entry points to subsequent locations can always be found on the current location's screen. The story is mostly linear. Once the player completes the quest associated with a particular location, there is usually no reason to return there. In most cases, return is impossible, because either the entrance is destroyed or the player travels to the next location via a game mechanic. Hidden items and quests are available, but they do not affect the story's progression.

When the characters engage in combat, they are taken to a separate combat screen. Battles are purely turn-based. Certain ability scores of the combatants determine which party acts first, and then actions alternate between the player characters and the enemies. The actions taken during battles mainly consist of normal attacks and casting spells. The players may also defend, throw and use items, and steal from the enemies. Once the appropriate equipment is obtained, the player may also capture monsters to later turn them into beneficial items. The magic system contains the five elements of wind, lightning, ice, fire, and earth, which form the descriptors for the offensive spells, each type able to counter another. There are also spells of no elemental type.

The player's equipment is primarily upgraded through treasures gained in mazes and acquisition from shops. Defeating monsters usually make negligible contributions to the player's inventory, but it is the primary source of money. Healing and combat support items can be made from captured monsters as well as bought. The player can also make poison-based weapons using certain types of venomous insects as raw material.

Development
The game was developed by the Kuangtu/Crazy Boys Production Team (狂徒製作群) of Softstar Entertainment, with concept work beginning as early as 1991. The group consisted at that time approximately 12 members, some being very young with little experience in game design. The Legend of Sword and Fairy was their first major RPG project. The production manager was Yao Zhuangxian (姚壯憲), who was 22 years old at the time. The game's music was composed by Lin Kunxin, whose most memorable titles include The Butterfly's Love (蝶戀), Martial Arts Contest for Marriage (比武招親), and Drunken Sword Master (酒劍仙). Lin Jiawen, a graphics artist on the team, was the major contributor to character portraits and animation. She also enthusiastically participated in the designing of the mazes, but her expertise in that area was limited.

Yao faced some turmoil in his love life during the game design process. This influenced him to integrate his own views of love into the game. Yao said, the three female protagonists are based on reality; Zhao Ling'er is like a girlfriend; Lin Yueru is like a lover, and Anu is like a mate. At some point, there arose a dispute regarding to the fate of two of the female characters in the end. In the finished game, this matter was intentionally made ambiguous where Lin is shown standing under a tree in the ending cinematic even though she is supposedly dead. Yao commented that he invested a great deal of feeling into the story, and the unclear ending was meant to leave events open to the players' imagination. In the years that followed the game's release in 1995, Yao did not wish to openly address questions regarding the game's ending. There was an anecdote about the ending: Yao was in favour of Zhao while another producer Xie Chonghui was preferred Lin. In Yao's blueprint of the whole game, the ending is that Lin's body is intact but her soul is destroyed while Zhao's body has disappeared but her soul exists. However, Xie disagreed with this setting. Eventually, this setting was broken by some final changes and the sequel indicated that Lin's body was preserved by a special type of insect.

Reception
The Legend of Sword and Fairy has been praised as the pioneer of Chinese RPGs. It has deeply affected a whole generation of Chinese, and established a particular Chinese style of story-telling and maze-running RPG. Many Chinese consider it to be one of the most classic RPG games ever made.

In the first month following the game's release in Taiwan, The Legend of Sword and Fairy sold over 100,000 copies. Sales reached 350,000 copies in mainland China a month after the game's release there. The game's sales totalled about two million copies, but as many as 20 million copies may be in circulation due to piracy.

The Legend of Sword and Fairy won numerous awards. In 1995, the game won the Best Role Playing Game award from the magazine CEM STAR and the Golden Bag Game award (遊戯類金袋奖) from KING TITLE. The Legend of Sword and Fairy was also on the top of the Best PC Game List of the New Gaming Era (新遊戯時代) magazine until October 1996, for 14 consecutive months; and topped the "My Favourite Singleplayer PC Game" list in the Pop Software (大衆軟件) magazine for ten years.

The Legend of Sword and Fairy is best characterised as a very memorable tragedy. Its plot, especially the ending, has moved many players to tears. Zhao Ling'er's death and the question of whether or not Lin Yueru was successfully resurrected have fuelled an abundance of forum discussions and fan fiction. Yao Zhuangxian became reputed as the "Father of Xianjian", and many players reverently refer to him as "Immortal Yao".

Due to popular demand, the Kuangtu production team released New Legend of Sword and Fairy in 2001. Minor changes were made to the storyline; and the graphics was greatly improved using better technology (new visual effects, reproduced music, some additional storyline details, etc.). The most significant and most requested addition was two new hidden endings. The game's success eventually led to the creation of the subsequent titles in The Legend of Sword and Fairy series, even somewhat against Yao's wishes.

Famitsu magazine scored the Sega Saturn version of this game 6/6/4/5 for a total of 21.

Versions

MS-DOS version
First released in 1995, it is often cited as the most successful video game in Taiwan and mainland China.

Windows 95/98 version
A re-release for the Windows 95/98 platforms. Some bugs (such as typos) in the former version were removed, and the whole difficulty reduced by simplification of mazes. Additionally, three-dimensional AVI clips were introduced in place of the original static pictures. Also, the RIX music used in the DOS version was replaced with MIDI tracks.

Sega Saturn version
This is a version designed for Sega Saturn console.

New version
This is a remake of the MS-DOS version, with minimal changes to the original story. Two alternate endings are dedicated to the two female protagonists of the story.

Initial release was in 2001, titled as New Legend of Sword and Fairy. It was re-released again as the New LSF XP version for the Windows XP platform.

SDLPal (Unofficial) 
This open-source project created by enthusiasts aims to reimplement the main executable PAL.exe with SDL without using proprietary source code. As of 2022, it can run perfectly on Windows (Including x86_64 and ARM64 which was not supported in the original version), macOS, Linux, Unix, Android, iOS, 3DS/Wii (Hacked consoles only), Windows Phone, Xbox One/Series (Under developer mode) and more.

This project was used by Softstar Entertainment to create a modern port for Windows (Steam/CubeGame) and iOS.

Spin-offs

The Xianjian Inn
An inn management simulation game released in 2001. The story is set in a lighthearted alternate universe based on the original game. The inn management portion of the game involves lodging and dining, and features day and night cycles with different available gameplay options. The female protagonists from the original game may also be taken on dates in the form of adventures in various locales.

Chinese Paladin Online
A MMORPG has been made and is currently in open beta in mainland China, Taiwan, Malaysia and Singapore.

Adaptations
In 2005, the game was adapted by Chinese Entertainment Shanghai into a television series titled Chinese Paladin, starring Hu Ge, Liu Yifei and Ady An.

See also
 Xuan-Yuan Sword
 Gujian Qitan

References

External links
  Official The Legend of Sword and Fairy website (Taiwan)  
  Official The Legend of Sword and Fairy website (Mainland)  
  Softstar's website
  Official Chinese Paladin Online website

1995 video games
DOS games
Windows games
1
Chinese-language-only video games
Fantasy video games
Role-playing video games
Video games developed in Taiwan
Video games set in Imperial China
Video games with isometric graphics
Video games featuring female protagonists
Video games about time travel
Single-player video games
Nanzhao in fiction